Thin Dark Line is a band from Reisterstown, Maryland. They are signed to One Eleven Records.

Discography

Albums
 The Upcoming (EP) (5/25/2003, Self-Released)
 Tonight, We Ride (EP) (5/15/2004, One Eleven Records)
 The Resolution (10/25/2005, One Eleven Records)
 North Col, "Three" (EP) Produced, Recorded, and Edited by Mike Yerardi in Baltimore, MD 2007 (Mixed by Paul Leavitt)

Band members
Bryan Barnes
Mike Barnes
Brent Kaminski
Ian Dexter

Former members
Patrick Stevenson (bass)
Mikey Lawson (bass)
Cheyne Truitt (drums)
Adam Thompson (drums)
Andy Cerdan (drums)
Paul Leavitt (drums, guitar)
Don Bradshaw (guitar)

External links

Pure Volume site
Thin Dark Line official myspace
111 official website
Thin Dark Line Profile on AbsolutePunk.net
Resolution Review on AbsolutePunk.net

Musical groups established in 2002
Alternative rock groups from Maryland
2002 establishments in Maryland